Kim Cheong-gi (born April 4, 1941) is a South Korean director of animated, fantasy, and science fiction films.

His most well known work, Robot Taekwon V (1976), is considered one of the milestones of Korean animation. With actor Shim Hyung-rae, he created the Ureme series, one of the more popular Korean children's series of the late 1980s.

Partial filmography 
Robot Taekwon V (animated) (1976)
Robot Taekwon V 3 (로보트 태권 V 3탄: 수중특공대) (animated) (1977)
Golden Wing 123 (황금날개 123) (animated) (1978)
Robot Taekwon V and Golden Wing 123  (animated) (1978)
Run, Wonder Princess! (날아라 원더공주) (1978)
Tale of Three Kingdoms (삼국지) (animated) (1980)
Super Taekwon V (수퍼 태권브이) (animated) (1982)
Wuroemae from the Outside (우뢰매 = 'Wuroemae,' or 'Ureme,' 'Uremae,' 'Uroi-mae,' etc.) (외계에서 온 우뢰매) (1986)
Space Gundam V (animated) (1983)
Wuroemae from the Outside, Part II (1986)
Operation of Alien Uremae  (1987)
Wuroemae 4: Thunder V Operation  (1987)
Super Hong Gil-Dong (슈퍼 홍길동) (1987)
New Machine Uremae 5 (1988)
Guru Kong-cho and Super Hong Kil-Dong 2 (공초도사와 슈퍼 홍길동 제2탄) (1988)
Bioman (바이오맨) (1989)
The Third Generation Uremae 6 (1989)
Super Hong Kil-Dong 3 (슈퍼 홍길동 3) (1989)
Samtos and Daengki Ddoli (삼토스와 댕기똘이) (1990)
Robot Tae Kwon V 90 (로보트 태권브이 90) (1990)
Ureme 7: The Return of Ureme Ulemae 7: Dolaon Ulemae (1992)
Gag Unit Robot Twins (개그특공대 로봇트윈스) (1993)
Ureme 8(우뢰매 8) (1993)

Queen Esther (왕후 에스더) (1996)
Lim Keok Jeong, Korean Robin Hood (의적 임꺽정) (1997)
Kwanggeto Taewang (The Great Emperor) (Canceled)

References
'Hangook Manhwa' (한국 만화) at Korean Wikipedia
Kim Cheong-Gi at Asiandb
김청기 at Yahoo! Korea (in Korean)

External links
The Great Emperor website

 Extensive interview can be found at www.korazy.com.au korazy.com.au
Kim Cheong-Gi's The Great Emperor at www.twitchfilm.net
  General information about 김청기 at the KMDb

1941 births
Living people
South Korean film directors
South Korean animated film directors
South Korean animators